The 2020 season was the San Jose Earthquakes' 38th year of existence, their 23rd season in Major League Soccer and their 13th consecutive season in the top-flight of American soccer.

Club

Current roster

Transfers

Transfers out

Competitions

Exhibitions

Major League Soccer

League tables

Western Conference

MLS is Back – Group Stage

Overall

Match results

MLS Cup Playoffs

U.S. Open Cup 

Due to their final standings for the 2019 season, the Earthquakes were scheduled enter the competition in the Third Round, to be played April 21–23. The ongoing coronavirus pandemic, however, forced the U.S. Soccer Federation to cancel the tournament on August 17, 2020.

References

San Jose Earthquakes seasons
San Jose Earthquakes
San Jose Earthquakes
San Jose Earthquakes